The University of Texas at El Paso (UTEP) is a public research university in El Paso, Texas. It is a member of the University of Texas System. UTEP is the second-largest university in the United States to have a majority Mexican American student population (about 80%) after the University of Texas Rio Grande Valley. It is classified among "R1: Doctoral Universities – Very high research activity." The university's School of Engineering is the nation's top producer of Hispanic engineers with M.S. and Ph.D. degrees.

UTEP is home to the Sun Bowl stadium, which hosts the annual college football competition the Sun Bowl every winter.

The campus is one of the few places in the world outside of Bhutan or Tibet to have buildings created with the Dzong architectural style. It sits on hillsides overlooking the Rio Grande river, with Ciudad Juárez in view across the Mexico–United States border.

History

Early history

On April 16, 1913, SB 183 was signed by the Texas governor allocating funding for a new educational institution that would later become UTEP, making it the second oldest academic institution in the University of Texas system. The school officially opened on September 28, 1914, with 27 students in buildings belonging to the former El Paso Military Institute on a site adjacent to Fort Bliss on the Lanoria Mesa. The school was founded in 1913 as the State School of Mines and Metallurgy, and a practice mineshaft survives on the campus. By 1916, enrollment had grown to 39 students, including its first two female students, Ruth Brown and Grace Odell.

On October 29, 1916, a devastating fire destroyed the main building of the school, prompting its relocation. In 1917, the new school facility was constructed on its present site above Mundy Heights at the Paso del Norte, with the land donated by several El Paso residents. In a period when United States architects were designing in styles adopted especially from Europe, Kathleen Worrell, wife of the university's dean, was attracted by photographs of the Kingdom of Bhutan in a 1914 issue of National Geographic magazine, which showed the dzong architecture style of its Buddhist monasteries. The resemblances between the local terrain and mountainous features of Bhutan inspired her to propose designing early buildings of the mining school in the dzong style. Liking its distinctiveness, administrations have continued to choose that style for additional facilities, including the Sun Bowl football stadium and parking garages. Dzong architecture has characteristics such as sloping sides, markedly overhanging roofs, and bands of colored decoration.

The University of Texas Board of Regents changed the name of the institution in 1919 first to the Department of Mines and Metallurgy and then to the College of Mines and Metallurgy of the University of Texas (TCM) in 1920. The school's name was changed again in 1949 to Texas Western College of The University of Texas (TWC).

Notable events at UTEP include the training in 1961 of the nation's first Peace Corps class, the construction of Sun Bowl Stadium in 1963, and the winning of the 1966 NCAA basketball tournament.

The University of Texas at El Paso
When the 60th Texas State Legislature designated the University of Texas as The University of Texas System in 1967, the name of the school was changed to The University of Texas at El Paso. While the 1967 law designated "U.T. El Paso" as the school's official abbreviated name, the school is more commonly referred to by its trademarked name of "UTEP". Known as the Miners since the school's opening in 1914, TCM's students painted a large "M" for Miners on the Franklin Mountains in 1923; this was later moved to a site adjacent to the Sun Bowl Stadium in the 1960s where it remains today.

The school has had achievements in academic and sports areas. In 1969, UTEP won the first of seven NCAA Men's Cross Country Championships. In 1974, UTEP's first doctoral degree program in Geological Sciences was approved. Also in 1974, UTEP won the first of seven NCAA Men's Indoor Track and Field Championships. In 1975 UTEP won both the NCAA Men's Outdoor and Indoor National Championships. UTEP is only one of a handful of universities to win at least 21 NCAA national championships in multiple sports.

The campus expanded in 1976 with the completion of the Engineering-Science Complex. That same year, the College of Nursing was founded. In 1977, the Special Events Center (now the Don Haskins Center) was built, featuring a 12,000-seat capacity for sporting events, live concerts, and other performances. An expansion of Sun Bowl Stadium followed in 1982, increasing its capacity to 52,000. The six-story University Library opened its doors to the public for the first time in 1984.

In 1988, Diana Natalicio became UTEP's first woman president. When she stepped down in August 2019, she was the longest-serving sitting president of a major public research university. In 1989, UTEP's second doctoral program was approved (in electrical engineering). Doctoral programs in computer engineering, psychology, and environmental science and engineering followed in 1991, 1993, and 1995, respectively. The university's cooperative pharmacy and nursing doctorate programs began in 1996 and 2000, respectively. A biological sciences doctorate program was started in 1997 and a history doctorate followed in 1999. Doctoral programs in international business, civil engineering, and rhetoric and composition were started in 2003.

In 1999, UTEP launched its MBA online degree program. It was designated as a Comprehensive Doctoral/Research-Intensive University by the Carnegie Foundation the following year. In 2002, the $11 million Larry K. Durham Sports Center opened and the Sam Donaldson Center for Communication Studies was established. The Academic Services and Biosciences buildings as well as the Engineering-Science complex in 2003. UTEP celebrated its 90th anniversary the next year with the Miners football team going to the Houston Bowl, and the men's basketball team made its 15th NCAA tournament appearance.

In August 2019, Heather Wilson, Ph.D., became UTEP's 11th president. She previously served as the Secretary of the U.S. Air Force.

Academics and research

The University of Texas at El Paso is subdivided into nine colleges and schools, each of which offers a variety of degree programs including undergraduate, graduate, and post-graduate. UTEP offers 74 undergraduate degrees, 76 master's-level degrees, and 22 doctoral degrees. UTEP follows a semester system with a spring, summer, and fall semester annually, along with a shorter wintermester in the month of January.

UTEP offers the USA's only bilingual M.F.A. creative writing program.

The university's research expenditure in fiscal year 2018 was $91 million.
UTEP is classified as an "R1: Research University (Highest research activity)" in the Carnegie Classification of Institutions of Higher Education.

The National Science Foundation has designated UTEP as a Model Institution for Excellence, one of only six in the country. UTEP is one of only 11 universities nationwide to receive a $5 million Teachers for a New Era (TNE) research grant from the Carnegie Corporation.

Hispanic Business magazine has twice ranked UTEP as the number one graduate engineering school for Hispanics. The National Action Council for Minorities in Engineering has called UTEP "a model for other engineering institutions who say that today's minority young people from low-income families can't succeed in a rigorous math- or science-based discipline."

In November 2012, it was announced Igor C. Almeida, professor of biological sciences at UTEP, had developed a fully protective vaccine against Chagas disease. UTEP also holds the rights to a patent (# 5,798,392) for the use of methanesulfonyl fluoride (MSF) as a central nervous system selective cholinesterase inhibitor for the treatment of Alzheimer's disease developed by Donald E. Moss in the department of psychology. A Phase I human clinical trial of MSF as a potential treatment for Alzheimer's disease was successfully completed in Germany.

UTEP's art gallery, the Stanlee and Gerald Rubin Center for the Visual Arts, specializes in site-specific art installations and exhibitions by renowned artists, which have included in the past Teresa Margolles, Tania Candiani, and Rafael Lozano-Hemmer. Under the leadership of its current director, Kerry Doyle, the Rubin Center has been recognized with grants and awards by the Texas Commission on the Arts, the National Endowment for the Arts, the Andy Warhol Foundation for the Visual Arts, the Lannan Foundation, the Leonard Nimoy Foundation, and others.

Campus architecture

In 1916, only two years after the school opened, the original campus buildings were destroyed in a fire. The school was rebuilt on its present site in 1917. Kathleen Worrell, the wife of the school's first dean Steve H. Worrell, had seen pictures of Bhutanese buildings in an April 1914 issue of National Geographic. Noting the similarity of mountainous Bhutan (which is in the Himalayas) to the location of the campus, she suggested the new buildings be in the style of Bhutanese dzongs (monastic fortresses), with massive sloping walls and overhanging roofs. This idea was enthusiastically accepted by all.

Prominent El Paso architect Henry Trost designed the first four buildings. All buildings since then have followed this style, including a fifth by Trost in 1920, and three more by his firm in 1933–1937. While the early structures only copied the general appearance of a dzong, recent buildings incorporate internal elements of the dzong form as well.

The kingdom of Bhutan has honored UTEP's adoption of their country's style. Prince Jigyel Ugyen Wangchuk has visited the campus, and in 2009 the Kingdom presented UTEP with a hand-carved wooden temple to be erected on the campus.

The Himalayan style of UTEP's campus made it an appropriate site for the Chenrezig Himalayan Cultural Center of El Paso, a Tibetan Buddhist facility.

School colors and logo
Since the school was established as a department of the main branch of the University of Texas at Austin, the school's colors were originally orange and white. However, in the early 1980s, Columbia blue was added so now the official colors are orange, white, and blue. When the new UTEP athletic department logo was introduced in the fall of 1999, a darker hue of blue was incorporated into the logo, as well as a silver accent to go with the customary orange.

Athletics

UTEP was the first college in the American South to integrate its intercollegiate sports programs. This change was made in the 1950s. When Don Haskins became basketball coach in 1961, he aggressively recruited black players. In 1966, Haskins' Miners won the NCAA basketball championship, defeating an all-white Kentucky team in the final game. At a time when many claimed black players lacked the mental and emotional "necessities" to compete at a high level, Haskins put his usual starting players in the championship game. They were the first all-black team to start in a game at that level. This story was retold in Haskins' autobiography Glory Road (2005) and in the 2006 film Glory Road. Haskins coached his entire career at UTEP and compiled a 719–353 record with only five losing seasons. He was inducted into the Basketball Hall of Fame in 1997, and the special events center was renamed the Don Haskins Center. He retired from coaching in 1999, and died in 2008. The entire 1966 UTEP team was inducted into the Hall of Fame in 2007.

In 1968, the UTEP track & field program revoked the scholarships of eight black athletes after they boycotted a meet at Brigham Young University in protest of perceived racism at BYU and in the Church of Jesus Christ of Latter-day Saints of the era. This included future gold medal winner and world record long jump holder Bob Beamon, who would briefly return to the school after the incident but not graduate. The coach at the time later regretted his actions, and felt that he and the school acted hastily.

UTEP's sports programs have won a total of 21 NCAA Division I national championships. UTEP is tied for 10th overall among schools in Men's Sports Division I championships.
Men's basketball: 1 (1966; the first of two NCAA men's basketball titles won by a university from the state of Texas)
Men's cross country: 7 (an eighth title was vacated by the NCAA following the championship)
Men's indoor track & field: 7
Men's outdoor track & field: 6

UTEP owns the two largest venues in El Paso, Texas:
Sun Bowl Stadium, seating capacity 51,500, opened its doors in 1963 and is the home to the UTEP football team and to the annual Sun Bowl game.
Don Haskins Center, seating capacity 12,000, was built in 1976 and is primarily used by the men's and women's basketball teams. It is also known as "The Bear's Den" as well as "The Don." The arena is also used for concerts by mainstream artists.
University Field (UTEP), seating capacity 500, was built in 1991 and hosts the women's soccer team.
Kidd Field, seating capacity 15,000, home of UTEP Track and Field teams.

In 2005, UTEP moved to Conference USA from the Western Athletic Conference.

On December 10, 2012, it was announced that Sean Kugler would be taking over as the new UTEP football coach.

In 2010, Tim Floyd became the head basketball coach. He was a protege of Haskins and is a former coach at the University of New Orleans, the NBA's Chicago Bulls and New Orleans Hornets, and the University of Southern California. Floyd retired in 2017 due to recurring health issues and was succeeded by Rodney Terry, former head coach at CSU Fresno (Fresno State).

Pickaxe hand symbol

This hand symbol represents the traditional tool used by miners, the pickaxe, and is similar to the shaka sign and the letter Y in American sign language. This gesture is made by UTEP fans when UTEP players are shooting free throws at basketball games, or any time UTEP kicks off at a football game. It originated during a cheer camp by the UTEP cheerleading squad during the early 1980s.

Nickname
The first reference to the nickname "Miners" is found in the February 1919 (volume 1, number 1) issue of the Prospector, the school's student newspaper. However, an earlier reference can be found in the handwritten bill (Senate Bill 183) that established the school in 1913, where the author, State Senator Claude Hudspeth, mistakenly wrote "Miners" instead of "Mines," and thus referred to the school as the "State School of Miners and Metallurgy." It is presumed the nickname "Miners" came from the fact the school was founded as the "State School of Mines and Metallurgy." In doing research on this project, early mention of "Ore Diggers" and "Muckers" for the nickname was found, but nothing to determine if the name "Miners" was voted upon by the student body, or if a faculty member, John W. (Cap) Kidd, chose the name. Kidd was a big booster of athletics, especially football, and in 1915, when funds were lean at the school, Kidd donated $800 to equip the football team, though there is no evidence other than anecdotal he contributed this amount. He also assisted with coaching, although he was not the head coach. The present track facility on campus, Kidd Field, bears Cap Kidd's name.

School songs
"The Eyes of Texas" was adopted by the 1920 student body after the song had been "declared the school anthem for the University of Texas at Austin".

UTEP's fight song, "Miners Fight", was also borrowed from the Austin campus.

With the permission of the estate of Marty Robbins, the UTEP Music Department in the late 1980s wrote new words to the melody of his Grammy Award-winning country-western hit "El Paso". This gave UTEP a fight song all its own, to a tune recognized across the nation.

Rivalries
New Mexico State University: UTEP has a strong rivalry with New Mexico State University, known as "The Battle of I-10". UTEP and NMSU are just over 40 miles apart.

Notable people

Faculty
Zuill Bailey, professor of cello, professional cellist
Steven Best, professor of philosophy and co-founder of the North American Animal Liberation Press Office
 Andy Cohen, Major League Baseball second baseman who coached university team for 17 years
Jorge Gardea-Torresdey, chemistry professor and nanoparticle researcher
Laurie Ann Guerrero, writer and Texas Poet Laureate
John Haddox, philosopher and Latin-Americanist
Anna Jaquez, art professor 
Jorge López, physics professor and educator
Urbici Soler y Manonelles, Spanish sculptor
Benjamin Alire Sáenz, writer
Ellwyn R. Stoddard, professor emeritus of anthropology and sociology
Rachelle Thiewes, American jeweler

Alumni
F. Murray Abraham – actor
Ana Alicia – actress
Tobi Amusan – Nigerian track and field athlete
Nate Archibald – professional basketball player
Jim "Bad News" Barnes – professional basketball player
Bob Beamon – track and field athlete and Olympian
Kevin Belcher – professional football player
Derrick Caracter – professional basketball player
Cortney Casey – professional mixed martial artist
Sam Donaldson – American reporter and news anchor
Fred Carr – professional football player
Alfredo Corchado – Mexican-American journalist
Oniel Cousins – professional football player
Alicia Cuarón – Mexican-American educator and human rights activist
George Daney – professional football player
James Davidson – professional football player
Antonio Davis – professional basketball player
Quintin Demps – professional football player
Tim Hardaway – professional basketball player
Aaron Jones – professional football player
Emmanuel Kipkurui Korir – Kenyan a middle-distance runner and Olympic athlete
Mia Khalifa – internet celebrity, former pornographic film actor, sports commentator
Jeffrey Martin – CEO and chairman of Sempra Energy
Suleiman Nyambui, Tanzanian track athlete and Olympian
Sam Simon – playwright, consumer advocate
Tony Tolbert – professional football player

Gallery

See also
 List of universities in Texas by enrollment
 History of Mexican Americans in Texas

Notes

References

External links

 
 UTEP Athletics website

 
1914 establishments in Texas
Buildings and structures in El Paso, Texas
Educational institutions established in 1914
Schools of mines in the United States
Tourist attractions in El Paso, Texas
Universities and colleges accredited by the Southern Association of Colleges and Schools
El Paso
University of Texas El Paso